Stefan Lichański (2 September 1914 in Warsaw - 30 October 1983 in Warsaw, Poland) was a Polish literature critic and writer.

During the Second World War he was arrested and imprisoned in the German concentration camp Auschwitz, but survived.

Works
 Literatura i krytyka (1956)
 Kuszenie Hamleta (1965)
 Cienie i profile (1967)
 Wśród mówiących prozą (1971)
 Pisarstwo wsi i ziemi (1983)
 Wladyslaw Stanislaw Reymont (Biblioteka "Polonistyki") (1984)

1914 births
1983 deaths
Polish male writers
Auschwitz concentration camp survivors
Recipients of the State Award Badge (Poland)